One More Chance may refer to:

Films 
 One More Chance (1931 film), an American film starring Bing Crosby and directed by Mack Sennett
 One More Chance (1983 film), an American film by Sam Firstenberg
 One More Chance (2005 American film), a short film by Darrell M. Smith
 One More Chance (2005 Singaporean film), a film by Jack Neo
 One More Chance (2007 film), a Filipino film by Cathy Garcia-Molina

Songs 
 "One More Chance" (Bloc Party song), 2009
 "One More Chance" (Madonna song), 1996
 "One More Chance" (Michael Jackson song), 2003
 "One More Chance" (The Notorious B.I.G. song), 1995
 "One More Chance" (Pet Shop Boys song), 1984
 "One More Chance" (will.i.am song), 2007
 "One More Chance", by Anastacia from Not That Kind, 2000
 "One More Chance", by Diana Ross from To Love Again, 1981
 "One More Chance", by Fairport Convention from Rising for the Moon, 1975
 "One More Chance", by the Jackson 5 from ABC, 1970
 "One More Chance", by the Jacksons from Victory, 1984
 "One More Chance", by Ocean, 1972
 "One More Chance", by Saliva from Blood Stained Love Story, 2007
 "One More Chance", by Yummy Bingham from The First Seed, 2006